Art Ensemble of Soweto is a 1990 album by the Art Ensemble of Chicago and the Amabutho Male Chorus released on the Japanese DIW label. It features performances by Lester Bowie, Joseph Jarman, Roscoe Mitchell, Malachi Favors Maghostut, and Don Moye with vocals by Elliot Ngubane, Kay Ngwazene, Welcome "Max" Bhe Bhe, Zacheuus Nyoni and Joe Leguabe.

Reception
The AllMusic review by Brian Olewnick describes the album as " very enjoyable recording, possibly the last all-around excellent Art Ensemble release before the group's retrenching after the departure of Joseph Jarman and the untimely death of Lester Bowie".

Track listing 
 "Coming Soon" (Bowie) – 1:31
 "African Woman" (Ngubone) – 13:55
 "Fundamental Destiny" (Jarman) – 9:14
 "Fresh Start" (Mitchell) – 6:42
 "Khauleza" (Amabutho Male Chorus) – 2:44
 "The Bottom Line" (Art Ensemble of Chicago) – 5:33
 "Black Man" (Amabutho Male Chorus) – 9:18
 Recorded December 1989 & January 1990 at Systems Two Studios, Brooklyn, NY

Personnel 
 Lester Bowie: trumpet, fluegelhorn, percussion
 Malachi Favors Maghostut: bass, balafon, percussion instruments
 Joseph Jarman: saxophones, clarinets, percussion instruments
 Roscoe Mitchell: saxophones, clarinets, flute, percussion instruments
 Don Moye: drums, percussion
 Elliot Ngubane: lead vocals, percussion, keyboards
 Kay Ngwazene: vocals
 Welcome "Max" Bhe Bhe: vocals
 Zacheuus Nyoni: vocals
 Joe Leguabe: vocals, percussion

References 

1990 albums
DIW Records albums
Art Ensemble of Chicago albums